United Nations Security Council Resolution 2038 was unanimously adopted on 29 February 2012.  It appoints a new prosecutor for the International Residual Mechanism for Criminal Tribunals.

See also 
List of United Nations Security Council Resolutions 2001 to 2100

References

External links
Text of the Resolution at undocs.org

2012 United Nations Security Council resolutions
February 2012 events
United Nations Security Council resolutions concerning the International Criminal Tribunal for the former Yugoslavia